Zena Brody (March 10, 1928 – June 12, 1971) worked for DC Comics as an editor for the romance comics line during the golden age of comics. On her appointment in 1949, Brody was the first ever woman comics editor.

Early life 
Brody was born to Samuel Friedland and Rebecca Rosen who were Russian immigrants. She only had one sibling, a sister named Gloria Jean Friedland. Brody attended the University of Michigan where she gained a Bachelor of Arts degree in English. She married Eugene Brody on June 24, 1951 in New York.

Career 
After graduating from the University of Michigan, Brody was hired on by editor in chief, Irwin Donnenfield, to be the first editor of the DC Comics romance line. In 1952, she was editing the titles, Secret Hearts, Girls' Romance and Girls' Love Stories. Donnefield said in an interview that: 

The romance magazines really appealed to young girls," he says, "so I felt a woman would have a better handle on what a young girl would like, better than a guy like Bon Kanigher, who was doing war books. 

Brody was hired on to launch the Girls' Love Stories, which took on traditional themes such as female behavior, gender roles, love, sex, and marriage. She continued on to edit Girls' Romances and Secret Hearts. Zena continued her career until she was succeeded by editors Ruth Brant, Phyllis Reed, and Dorothy Woolfolk.

References 

1928 births
1971 deaths
Mass media people from New York (state)
University of Michigan  College of Literature, Science, and the Arts alumni
Comic book editors
American comics creators